Longeau may refer to:

 Longeau, Belgium, a village of Wallonia in the province of Luxembourg, part of the municipality of Messancy.
 Longeau (river), a river in the Lorraine region of France.